Stilley or Stiley is a surname of the following people:
Dave Stilley (born 1974), American lacrosse player
Joe Stiley, American businessman and passenger of the Air Florida Flight 90 
John Stilley Carpenter (1849–1925), American settler and  bishop of the LDS Church in Utah
Kate Stilley Steiner, American filmmaker, editor, and producer
 Margo Stilley  (born 1982), American actress and writer

English-language surnames